Shekui Kaghan (r. 611–619 or possibly 610–617; Middle Chinese: *ʑia-gwi; Middle Persian Zyk, Žeg) was the third khagan of the Western Turkic Khaganate. He was the grandson of Tardu (575–603) through his son Tulu (都六).

Background 
Western Turkic Empire in present-day Turkestan was founded as the result of the partition of the main empire after the death of Tardu in 603. It was also called On Ok ("Ten arrows") referring to ten powerful tribes in the empire. Five tribes (called Duolu) to the northeast and five tribes to the southwest (called Nushibi) formed the two rival factions, the border line being Ili River.

After Partitioning
Sheguy was Tardu's grandson and governor of Chach (Tashkent) He was expected to be enthroned after the death of Tardu. But the Dulu faction enthroned Taman (also called Heshana Khan) who was a generation younger than Sheguy. But Taman was a very inexperienced ruler and was a puppet of Dulu clan. Nushibi clan as well as Silk road merchants who suffered from the increasing anarchy supported Sheguy to throne in 611. When Taman partisans arrested a Chinese ambassador to Sheguy, Sheguy revolted and Taman had to flee to Sui China where he was killed.

Sheguy maintained order in his empire and provided security of the silk road. His term marks the beginning of Nushibi supremacy. In 618, he was succeeded by his brother Tong during whose reign Western Turkic Empire reached to apogee.

References

7th-century Turkic people
618 deaths
Göktürk khagans
Silk Road
Ashina house of the Turkic Empire
Year of birth unknown